Šemetkovce is a village and municipality in Svidník District in the Prešov Region of north-eastern Slovakia. One of its churches, Church of Michael the Archangel, is one of the country's wooden treasures.

History
In historical records the village was first mentioned in 1572.

Geography
The municipality lies at an altitude of 363 metres and covers an area of 7.076 km². It has a population of about 100 people.

References

External links
 
 
 http://www.statistics.sk/mosmis/eng/run.html

Villages and municipalities in Svidník District
Šariš